WFLA (970 kHz) is a commercial AM radio station in Tampa, Florida, and serving the Tampa Bay media market. The station airs a talk radio format and is owned and operated by iHeartMedia, Inc.  The station's studios and offices are located on Gandy Boulevard in South Tampa.

WFLA broadcasts by day at 25,000 watts, reducing power to 11,000 watts at night.  (For most of its history, from the 1940s to the early 2000s, it ran at 5,000 watts.)  It uses a directional antenna at all times.  The main transmitter site is off Montague Street in Town 'n' Country, Florida.  Programming is also heard on two FM translators, 94.5 MHz in Gulfport and 99.1 in Bayonet Point.

Programming
Weekdays on WFLA begin with a local morning show, AM Tampa Bay, hosted by Jack Harris, Aaron Jacobson, Katie Butchino and Natalie Aquilia.  From 7 a.m. to 9 a.m., The Ryan Gorman Show airs, hosted by Ryan Gorman, who used to host PM Tampa Bay. The station used to also be the flagship for nationally syndicated The Schnitt Show with Todd Schnitt, but now features more nationally-syndicated Premiere Networks news opinion programs hosted by Glenn Beck, Clay Travis and Buck Sexton, Sean Hannity, and Jesse Kelly. It carries Coast to Coast AM overnight.

Weekends feature shows on money, health, law, boating and fishing.  Some weekend shows are paid brokered programming.  On weekends, WFLA carries Sunday Night Live with Bill Cunningham, This Morning, America's First News with Gordon Deal and Somewhere in Time with Art Bell.

WFLA provides local newscasts on both weekdays and weekends. Evening and overnight newscasts are pre-recorded. National and world news is provided by Fox News Radio and NBC News Radio.  WFLA provides news coverage for other iHeartMedia stations in the Tampa Bay market, and is a hub for the Florida News Network.

WFLA occasionally serves as an overflow outlet for sports programming from sister stations WDAE and WHNZ.

Other stations carrying the WFLA brand
Another Clear Channel radio station in Tallahassee took the call sign WFLA-FM. Its sister station in the Orlando area, WFLF (AM), uses "WFLA" as its branding. Both WFLA-FM and WFLF carries many of the same nationally syndicated programming as WFLA, but all three stations have their own local shows and news.

WFLF-FM also previously carried the WFLA brand and programming in Panama City until September 2021; since then, the WFLA brand has been carried by two FM translators in the area.

History
In 1925, the station first signed on as WGHB in Clearwater. In 1927, its call sign changed to WFHH, and later that year to WFLA at 1130 kHz.

WSUN jointly licensed with WFLA as WFLA-WSUN

WSUN was first authorized in October 1927, joining WFLA at 590 kHz, with this station now assigned a dual call sign of WFLA-WSUN, under shared ownership by the Clearwater and St. Petersburg Chambers of Commerce. WSUN made its debut broadcast on November 1st, using the slogan "Why Stay Up North".

In 1927 WFLA-WSUN moved to 580 kHz, then to 900 kHz the next year. In 1929, radio frequencies for stations in Florida were reallocated, and WFLA-WSUN moved to 620 kHz.

The station's transmitter site was originally on the north side of the Courtney Campbell Causeway near Clearwater.

First directional antenna in the United States

WFLA-WSUN's move to 620 kHz resulted in a nighttime interference complaint from another station on that frequency, WTMJ in Milwaukee, Wisconsin. WFLA-WSUN was ordered to reduce powers from 1,000 watts night and 2,500 watts day to 250 watts night and 500 watts day.

Station manager Walter Tison began an investigation into whether there was a way that WFLA-WSUN could increase its nighttime power to a more acceptable level. Working with 
T. A. M. Craven, a British engineer, Raymond M. Wilmotte, was engaged in 1932 to construct a then-theoretical antenna system that would reduce the signal sent toward Milwaukee. The idea that a directional antenna would resolve the issue was somewhat controversial, with some doubters stating that fluctuations in the ionosphere would cause issues, while others believed that instead of going directly to Milwaukee, the WFLA-WSUN signal was actually travelling west through the Gulf of Mexico, then turning north through the Mississippi valley.

The directional antenna installation, the first in the United States, consisting of two 200 foot (61 m) towers, was successful. As an example of its effectiveness, engineer Wilmotte noted that at one point a telegram was sent from regulators in Washington asking why WFLA-WSUN was off the air, because an inspector located in Atlanta was not receiving the station when it employed the directional antenna.

WFLA and WSUN switch to separate licenses

WFLA and WSUN were affiliates of the NBC Red Network, carrying dramas, comedies, news, sports, soap operas, game shows and big band broadcasts during the "Golden Age of Radio."

In 1937, the joint ownership of WFLA-WSUN was severed, with the two stations continuing to operate on 620 kHz using a common transmitter, but separately licensed on a time-sharing basis. WFLA was allocated full-time use of Mondays, Wednesdays, and Fridays, and shared hours on Sundays.

WFLA becomes full-time station after frequency change

In 1940, The Tribune Company was given permission to construct a full-time station on 940 kHz. Because this was technically a new station, this authorization was initially given the call sign of WKGA. However, the authorization included shutting down WFLA on 620 kHz, so when operations began on 940 kHz, the historic WFLA call sign was transferred to the new frequency. WFLA's owner also owned The Tampa Tribune.  The studios and offices were in the Seminole Building. WSUN stayed on 620 kHz, licensed to St. Petersburg (now WDAE).

From 1945 to 1949, WFLA carried a southern gospel show, which featured legendary bass singer J. D. Sumner and The Sunny South Quartet.  WFLA and WSUN were owned by the Clearwater and St. Petersburg Chambers of Congress.

An advertisement in the 1950 edition of Broadcasting Yearbook said that WFLA-AM-FM were the "most listened to" stations in "the heart of Florida's most heavily populated trade area."

FM and TV
WFLA added an FM station in 1948, WFLA-FM (now WFLZ).  In its early years, WFLA-FM largely simulcast its AM sister station.  In the mid-to-late 1960s, it switched from Top 40 to beautiful music. A television station also went on the air in 1955, WFLA-TV, which is now owned by the Nexstar Media Group.  Because WFLA-AM-FM carried NBC programming, WFLA-TV also joined the NBC Television Network.

Once network programming had shifted from radio to television, WFLA began a full service middle of the road format of popular adult music, news, and sports.  It later tried Top 40 and Adult Contemporary music.  In the 1980s, listeners shifted to FM to hear music, so WFLA increased the news and talk programming. In 1982, WFLA hired street reporter Sam Cardinale from WPLP to make the move toward news-oriented programming. Cardinale won multiple AP and UPI awards for the station for news coverage before joining WTVT.  In 1986, WFLA made the full transition to all-talk. It has been the market leader in this format ever since, and usually is among the top five stations in the market, according to Arbitron ratings.

Changes in ownership
Media General acquired the Tribune Company in the 1970s.  This meant one company controlled, in Tampa, a newspaper, TV station, AM station and FM station. However, the Federal Communications Commission (FCC) were discouraging one owner from controlling so much media in one market.  In the 1980s, federal regulations forced Media General to divest the radio stations because of its other holdings. The radio stations were sold to Blair Broadcasting in late 1982. Sconnix Communications of Charleston, South Carolina, bought WFLA and what was then WPDS from Blair Broadcasting in 1987.  Blair was divesting all of its English-language broadcasting properties to concentrate on its Spanish-language TV network, Telemundo.  Jacor Communications purchased WFLA from Sconnix in 1988.  In 1989, the station moved from Jackson Street in downtown Tampa to its present location at 4002 W. Gandy Blvd., in south Tampa.   Clear Channel Communications, purchased Jacor in 1999, which included WFLA and WFLZ.  Clear Channel was the forerunner of today's iHeartMedia.

Past personalities
WFLA gave national hosts Glenn Beck and Lionel their starts in talk radio. Other prominent alumni, from the days when the station concentrated on local programming, include Bob Lassiter (d. 2006), Jay Marvin, Dick Norman (d. 1989), Chuck Harder, Jack Ellery and Freddy Mertz. Other former hosts include Al Gardner, Mark Larsen, Daniel Ruth, Mark Beiro, Paul Gonzalez and Mel Berman (d. 2010).

Over the years, AM Tampa Bay has had three female co-hosts; Sharon Taylor, who was let go after ten years, Allyson Turner, who left less than a year after she was hired, and Corey Dylan, who was promoted to her own show at sister station WMTX after four years on WFLA. Longtime news anchors and reporters Steve Hall and Sharon Parker were released in a 2019 iHeart round of layoffs.

Translators

References

External links

 (covering 1940 until 1979 for operation on 940 and 970 kHz as WKGA/WFLA)

Hillsborough County, Florida
FLA (AM)
News and talk radio stations in the United States
Radio stations established in 1925
IHeartMedia radio stations
1925 establishments in Florida
Shortwave radio stations in the United States